Abraham is an unincorporated community in Millard County, in the U.S. state of Utah.

History
The first settlement at Abraham was made in 1890. A post office called Abraham was established in 1899, and remained in operation until 1954. The community was named after Abraham H. Cannon, a Mormon leader.

References

Unincorporated communities in Millard County, Utah
Great Basin National Heritage Area
1890 establishments in Utah Territory
Populated places established in 1890